Virna Pieralisi (8 November 1936 – 18 December 2014), better known as Virna Lisi, was an Italian actress. Her international film appearances included How to Murder Your Wife (1965), Not with My Wife, You Don't! (1966), The Secret of Santa Vittoria (1969), Beyond Good and Evil (1977), and Follow Your Heart (1996). Considered to be one of the greatest Italian film actresses alongside Sophia Loren and Gina Lollobrigida, she is known for her work with actors Tony Curtis and Jack Lemmon who both starred with Marilyn Monroe in film Some Like it Hot ! For the 1994 film La Reine Margot, she won Best Actress at Cannes and the César Award for Best Supporting Actress.

Career

Early career
Born in Ancona, Lisi began her film career in her teens. Discovered in Rome by two Neapolitan producers, Antonio Ferrigno and Ettore Pesce, she debuted in La corda d'acciaio (The Steel Rope, 1953). Initially, she appeared in musical films, like E Napoli canta (Naples Sings, 1953) and Questa è la vita (Of Life and Love, 1954, with Totò). Nonetheless, her beauty was more valued than her talent, as seen in the films Le diciottenni (Eighteen Year Olds) and Lo scapolo (The Bachelor), both released in 1955. Despite this, she filled some demanding roles, particularly in La donna del giorno (1956), Eva (1962), and the spectacle Romolo e Remo (1961).

In the late 1950s, Lisi performed on stage at Piccolo Teatro di Milano in I giacobini by Federico Zardi under the direction of Giorgio Strehler. During the 1960s, Lisi appeared in comedies and participated in television dramas that were widely viewed in Italy. Lisi also promoted a toothpaste brand on television with a slogan that would become a catchphrase among Italians: "con quella bocca può dire ciò che vuole" (with such a mouth, she can say whatever she wants).

Hollywood career
Though she turned down the Tatiana Romanova role in From Russia with Love (1963), Hollywood producers sought a new Marilyn Monroe and so, Lisi debuted in Hollywood comedy as a green-eyed blonde temptress with Jack Lemmon in How to Murder Your Wife (1965) and appeared with Tony Curtis in Not with My Wife, You Don't! (1966). Lisi then starred with Frank Sinatra, in Assault on a Queen (1966), in The Girl and the General, co-starring with Rod Steiger, and in two films with Anthony Quinn, The Secret of Santa Vittoria, directed by Stanley Kramer, and the war drama The 25th Hour. She garnered attention for a photo of her 'shaving' her face that appeared on the March 1965 cover of Esquire magazine.

Later career in Europe

To overcome her typecasting playing seductresses, Lisi sought new types of roles, of evil women or of a lover in relationships of disparate age for example. In those years, she participated in Italian productions, in Casanova 70 and Le bambole (1965), Arabella (1967), and Le dolci signore (1968). Lisi also starred in The Birds, the Bees and the Italians (1966) which shared the Grand Prix (then equivalent to the Palme d'Or, which was not awarded at the time) with A Man and a Woman at the Cannes Film Festival that year.

In the early 1970s, she took a temporary hiatus from acting to spend more time with her husband Franco Pesci and their son, Corrado. Nonetheless, Lisi's career underwent a renaissance with a number of projects, including Al di là del bene e del male (1977), Ernesto (1979), and La cicala (1980). For the film La Reine Margot (1994), Lisi's portrayal of Catherine de' Medici won her both the César and Cannes Film Festival awards, along with a Silver Ribbon for Best Supporting Actress. In 2002, Lisi starred in Il più bel giorno della mia vita.

Virna Lisi then participated in many sitcoms and TV series. Her last movie was in the Italian comedy drama Latin Lover in 2014, shortly before her death.

Death
On 18 December 2014, Lisi died of lung cancer in Rome at age 78.

Legacy
The Argentinian band Sumo (led by Luca Prodan) made a song for her, "" (1986), composed by Luca Prodan, whose brother, the actor Andrea Prodan, appeared with her in the movie I ragazzi di via Panisperna (1988). A Brazilian rock band named  (1989–1997) was named after her. Meilland International SA named a rose after her in 1989.

Filmography

Television
 Cenerentola (1961) as Cenerentola
  (1961)
  (1962) as Sondra Finchley
 Christopher Columbus (1985) as Dona Moniz Perestrello
  (1996)
 Desert of Fire (1997) as Christine Duvivier
  (1999) as Laure de Berny
  (1999) as Sanna
 Le ali della vita (2000) as Sorella Alberta
 Piccolo mondo antico (2001) as Marchesa Orsola
 Il bello delle donne (2001) as Contessa Miranda Spadoni
 Caterina e le sue figlie (2005–2010) as Caterina
 L'onore e il rispetto (2006) as Ersilia Fortebracci

References

External links

 
 

1936 births
2014 deaths
Cannes Film Festival Award for Best Actress winners
David di Donatello winners
Ciak d'oro winners
Italian film actresses
Italian stage actresses
Italian television actresses
Nastro d'Argento winners
David di Donatello Career Award winners
20th-century Italian actresses
21st-century Italian actresses
Best Supporting Actress César Award winners
People from Ancona
Deaths from lung cancer in Lazio
Burials at the Cimitero Flaminio